Dirk Klinkenberg (15 November 1709, Haarlem – 3 March 1799, The Hague) was secretary of the Dutch government for 40 years. He was also known as a mathematician and amateur astronomer.

Jan de Munck, Dirk Klinkenberg, and Jean-Philippe de Cheseaux each independently discovered the Great Comet of 1744 (aka C/1743 X1). Klinkenberg would later also discover comets C/1748 K1 and C/1762 K1.

Asteroid 10427 Klinkenberg, named after him, was discovered on September 24, 1960 by husband and wife team Cornelis Johannes van Houten and Ingrid van Houten-Groeneveld.

References

1709 births
1799 deaths
18th-century Dutch astronomers
Scientists from Haarlem